Camperville is a community in the Canadian province of Manitoba.

Camperville's residents are mainly Métis. It is situated on the western shore of Lake Winnipegosis. Manitoba Highway 20 passes through the village.

Local economy includes salt mining, tourism, hunting, fishing and trapping.

History
The community was named for Father C.J. Camper, an early Roman Catholic missionary. The community had a church built 1906–1910, which was subsequently destroyed in 1930 but was rebuilt, as the walls of the old church were reusable. However, one can easily distinguish between the two because the first church had a two-storey steeple while the steeple on the second was only one storey.

Demographics 

See also
Pine Creek First Nation
Duck Bay, Manitoba

References

External links
 Palmer, Gwen. "Camperville and Duck Bay. Part 1 - Camperville" Manitoba Pageant, Autumn 1972, Volume 18, Number 2

Designated places in Manitoba
Northern communities in Manitoba
Unincorporated communities in Parkland Region, Manitoba